Patman may refer to:

Mr. Patman, 1981 film directed by John Guillermin
Robinson–Patman Act of 1936, a United States federal law that prohibits anticompetitive practices,
William Neff Patman, (1927–2008), American politician and member of the United States House of Representatives
Wright Patman (1893–1976), U.S. Congressman from Texas and chair of the United States House Committee on Banking and Currency (1965–75)
Wright Patman Dam, earth-fill dam across the Sulphur River in northeast Texas in the United States
Wright Patman Lake, reservoir in northeast Texas in the United States
Patrick Patterson, Basketball player for the Toronto Raptors